Wesley Thomas (26 November 1964 – 1 February 1994) was a Grenadian cricketer. He played in twenty-one first-class and eleven List A matches for the Windward Islands from 1984 to 1993. He died from liver cancer at the age of 29.

See also
 List of Windward Islands first-class cricketers

References

External links
 

1964 births
1994 deaths
Grenadian cricketers
Windward Islands cricketers
Deaths from liver cancer
Deaths from cancer in Grenada